Olivier Deschacht (born 16 February 1981) is a Belgian professional football coach and a former player who played as a left-back or centre-back. He is an assistant coach for the Belgium national under-21 football team.

Career

Early career
At the age of 7, Deschacht began playing for S.K. Begonia Lochristi before he moved to K.A.A. Gent in 1991.  He then spent two years (1995–1997) at K.S.C. Lokeren Oost-Vlaanderen.

Anderlecht
In 1997 he signed for R.S.C. Anderlecht to play in their academy. He made his first team debut on 18 December 2001 under the coaching of Aimé Anthuenis.

For the 2007 season, Deschacht was awarded the captain's armband replacing teammate Bart Goor during Goor's injuries. After Goor's move to Germinal Beerschot, he was awarded captaincy full-time in 2008.

Lokeren
In August 2018, free agent Deschacht joined Lokeren on a season-long contract, returning to his former youth club.

Retirement
In April 2021, Deschacht announced that he would retire at the end of the 2020–21 season.

Coaching career
In October 2021, Deschact was appointed assistant coach for the Belgium under-21 national team.

Career statistics

Club

International

Honours
Anderlecht
 Belgian First Division (8): 2003–04, 2005–06, 2006–07, 2009–10, 2011–12, 2012–13, 2013–14, 2016–17
 Belgian Cup: 2007–08
 Belgian Super Cup (7): 2006, 2007, 2010, 2012, 2013, 2014, 2017

Individual
 Player with the most games for RSC Anderlecht (2018): 602 
 DH The Best RSC Anderlecht Team Ever (2020)

References

External links
 
 
 
 

1981 births
Living people
Walloon people
Footballers from Ghent
Belgian footballers
Association football fullbacks
Association football central defenders
Belgium international footballers
Belgian Pro League players
K.A.A. Gent players
K.S.C. Lokeren Oost-Vlaanderen players
R.S.C. Anderlecht players
S.V. Zulte Waregem players
Belgian football managers